Shelkovnikov (masculine) or Shelkovnikova (feminine) may refer to:
Boris Shelkovnikov (1837–1878), Russian general
Shelkovnikov (rural locality), a rural locality (a khutor) in Koshekhablsky District of the Republic of Adygea, Russia